North Central Province cricket team was a Sri Lankan first class cricket team that represents North Central Province. The team was established in 2004 and only featured in two Inter-Provincial First Class Tournaments, the 2003-04 and 2004-05, both of which they came second to Kandurata. The team was captained by Mahela Jayawardene.

History

2003–04 Ten Sports Inter-Provincial Tournament

2004–05 Inter-Provincial Tournament

Players

Squad

Notable players

 Akalanka Ganegama
 Amila Wethathasinghe
 Chanaka Welagedara
 Charith Sylvester
 Dhanuka Pathirana
 Farveez Maharoof
 Gayan Wijekoon
 Janaka Gunaratne
 Kumar Dharmasena
 Lanka De Silva
 Mahela Jayawardene
 Manoj Mendis
 Nandika Ranjith
 Nuwan Kulasekara
 Omesh Wijesiriwardene
 Praneeth Jayasundera
 Rangana Herath
 Shantha Kalavitigoda
 Tillakaratne Dilshan

Honours

Domestic

First Class
 Inter-Provincial First Class Tournament: 0

List A
 Inter-Provincial Limited Over Tournament: 0

Twenty20
 Inter-Provincial Twenty20: 0

References

Former senior cricket clubs of Sri Lanka